Gonada flavidorsis is a moth in the family Depressariidae. It was described by Edward Meyrick in 1930. It is found in Rio de Janeiro, Brazil.

The wingspan is about 26 mm. The forewings are light violet pink with the costal edge white and with a very obscure median streak of violet-whitish irroration (sprinkles) from about one-fourth to the apex, posteriorly more faintly expanded towards the costa. There is a suffused orange-yellow dorsal streak from near the base, posteriorly attenuated on the dorsal edge to the tornus. The hindwings are pale orange-pinkish.

References

Moths described in 1930
Gonada